Back to Front may refer to:

Back to Front (Gilbert O'Sullivan album), 1972
Back to Front (Caravan album), 1982
Back to Front (Lionel Richie album), 1992
Back to Front (The Temptations album), 2007
Back to Front (Viktor Lazlo album), 1996
Back to Front (Wink album), 1995
Back to Front: Live in London, a 2014 Peter Gabriel concert film and album

See also 
"Front Back", a song by T.I.